Awendo is a constituency in Kenya. It is one of eight constituencies in Migori County.

References 

Constituencies in Migori County